Paul Stupar (27 December 1866 – 26 January 1928) was an Austro-Hungarian naval officer holding the rank of rear admiral.

Early life
Stupar was born on 27 December 1866 in Pazin, Austria-Hungary, to Jakov and Maria Stupar (née Camus), and was baptized as Paulus Ioannes (Paul Johann, Pavao Ivan). Stupar's father Jakob was a lower official at the district court of Pazin.

In 1882, Stupar enrolled at the Austrian naval academy in Rijeka, graduating in 1886, the year in which he began his career in the navy.

In July 1898, he was part of the commission of a fire extinguishing experiment.

Career
Stupar is noted with the rank of ship-of-the-line lieutenant (Linienschiffsleutnant) in 1901-04 on  the staff list of Rijeka's naval academy. His brother Anthäus was professor at the academy from 1903 until 1914.

In 1907, Stupar was appointed commander of the minelayer Salamander in Pula. In 1910, he commanded the torpedo boat Satellit as corvette captain, and in 1912 was promoted to the rank of frigate captain. In 1913 he then commanded the light cruiser Aspern, participating in the naval blockade of Montenegro. He assumed command of the armored cruiser Sankt Georg in August 1913 and commanded it until October of that year. In March 1914 he became the commander of the battleship Babenberg.

He commanded the military warehouses in Šibenik since August 1914, with the rank of battleship captain.

He commanded the battleship Erzherzog Friedrich in 1917, and on 1 May 1918 was promoted counter admiral (i.e. rear admiral).

Stupar was twice awarded the Military Merit Cross 3rd Class.

References

Sources
Dienstbestimmungen, Polaer Tagbatt, 495., 3. 3. 1907.; Almanach für die k. und k. Kriegsmarine 1918., Pola; Nenad Labus, "Vojnopomorska akademija - spisak zaposlenika od 1858. do 1918."

External links
Paul Stupar at Istrapedia

1866 births
1928 deaths
People from Pazin
Austro-Hungarian admirals